Black and White Club may refer to

 Black and White Club, a driving club
 Black and White Club of the Australian Cartoonists' Association
 Black and White Club (art association) founded in the 19th century in New York